Uche Henry Agbo (born 4 December 1995) is a Nigerian professional footballer who plays as either a centre-back or a defensive midfielder for Slovan Bratislava of the Fortuna Liga.

Club career
Born in Kano, Uche started playing for local lowly Bai Boys, and moved to Taraba in 2010. In May 2011 he signed for JUTH, and appeared regularly for the side, scoring once.

In January 2012 Uche joined Enyimba International along with teammate James Amankwei. He made his debut for the club on 28 April 2013, coming on as a second-half substitute in a 2–0 win against Dolphins.

In October 2013, Uche went on a trial at Udinese, signing a four-year deal in the following month. In March 2014 he moved to Granada CF, linking up with the Andalusians also until 2018 and being assigned to the reserves in Segunda División B.

On 23 February 2015, Uche made his first team – and La Liga – debut, replacing Javi Márquez in the dying minutes of a 2–1 away loss against Levante UD. On 25 July of the following year, he signed a five-year contract with Premier League club Watford, being immediately loaned back to Granada for one year.

On 11 July 2017, Uche joined Belgian club Standard de Liège. On 31 January 2019, he returned to Spain and its first division after agreeing to a six-month loan at Rayo Vallecano, with an option to buy. In doing so, he said that he had turned down a big-money move to China, as his career development was more important.

On 21 January 2020, after a six-month loan spell at S.C. Braga, Uche agreed to a deal with Deportivo de La Coruña, still owned by Standard.

On 1 September 2021, following mass exodus from La Coruña, Agbo was announced as a signing of reigning Slovak champions Slovan Bratislava on a three-year contract. His performance against Slovan from the Europa League was recalled in his introduction.

International career
Uche got his first call up to the senior Nigeria side to replace the injured Leon Balogun for a 2018 FIFA World Cup qualifier against Zambia in October 2016. On 1 June 2017, he made his international debut for Nigeria in a 3–0 win against Togo in a friendly replacing Wilfred Ndidi. 

Uche was included in Nigeria's preliminary 30-man squad for the 2018 FIFA World Cup in Russia, but he did not make the final 23-man squad.

Career statistics

Club

Honours
Slovan Bratislava
Fortuna Liga: 2021–22

References

External links

1995 births
Living people
Sportspeople from Kano
Nigerian Christians
Nigerian footballers
Nigerian expatriate footballers
Nigeria under-20 international footballers
Nigeria international footballers
Association football midfielders
Taraba F.C. players
JUTH F.C. players
Enyimba F.C. players
Udinese Calcio players
Club Recreativo Granada players
Granada CF footballers
Rayo Vallecano players
Deportivo de La Coruña players
Watford F.C. players
Standard Liège players
S.C. Braga players
ŠK Slovan Bratislava players
La Liga players
Segunda División players
Segunda División B players
Belgian Pro League players
Primeira Liga players
Slovak Super Liga players
Nigerian expatriate sportspeople in Italy
Nigerian expatriate sportspeople in Spain
Nigerian expatriate sportspeople in England
Nigerian expatriate sportspeople in Belgium
Nigerian expatriate sportspeople in Portugal
Nigerian expatriate sportspeople in Slovakia
Expatriate footballers in Italy
Expatriate footballers in Spain
Expatriate footballers in England
Expatriate footballers in Belgium
Expatriate footballers in Portugal
Expatriate footballers in Slovakia